Compsoctena vilis is a moth in the family Eriocottidae. It was described by Francis Walker in 1865. It is found in India.

References

Moths described in 1865
Compsoctena
Moths of Asia